Crimean War medal may refer to:

British Crimean War Medal
Turkish Crimean War medal
Sardinian Crimea Medal
Baltic Medal, awarded for naval operations in the Baltic